Atari, Inc. is an American subsidiary and publishing arm of Atari SA. Formed in 1993 as GT Interactive Software Corp., the video game publishing arm of GoodTimes Home Video, the company was subsequently majority acquired by Infogrames in 1999, and later renamed to Infogrames, Inc. As part of Infogrames's company-wide re-branding following its 2001 acquisition of Hasbro Interactive, which owned the rights to the Atari brand, Infogrames, Inc. became known as Atari, Inc. in May 2003. On October 11, 2008, Infogrames completed its acquisition of Atari, Inc., making it a wholly owned subsidiary.

Prior to its acquisition by Infogrames, GT Interactive was known for publishing games such as the original Doom, Quake, Driver, the first Unreal and acquiring developers such as Reflections Interactive and Legend Entertainment.

History

1993: Founding of GT Interactive
The GT Interactive Software Corp. was founded in February 1993 as a division of GoodTimes Home Video, a video-tape distributor owned by the Cayre family, with Ron Chaimowitz as co-founder and president. That same year the publisher saw the release of their first shareware title, the hugely popular Doom. In its first year, revenue reached $10.3 million. GT was the first publisher to allow developers to retain their Intellectual Property.

1994: 880% revenue growth
GT Interactive revenue soared 880% and reached $101 million in its second year of existence, with profits reaching $18 million. GT Interactive's partnership with id Software scored another hit with Doom II: Hell on Earth, which was released in October and sold over 2 million copies.

1995 – Initial public offering
In February GT Interactive obtained the publishing rights to games based on Mercer Mayer property, which included Little Critter and Little Monster. GT Interactive began to set up displays at Kmart and Walmart for low cost software.

GT Interactive signed an exclusive software supplier agreement with Walmart, that meant according to UBS Securities analyst Michael Wallace: "All software developers have to deal with GT if they want to sell in a Walmart."

In December GT Interactive debuted on the NASDAQ stock exchange under the stock symbol GTIS. Raising $140 million with its initial public offering, it was one of the biggest IPOs of the year, second only to Netscape's.

GT Interactive offered 10 million shares to the public at $14 each.  During GT Interactive's IPO, Joseph Cayre sold more than 1.4 million shares, 9.2% of his shares, for a $20 million return.

GT Interactive reported a strong revenue growth of 134% in the year to $234.4 million but, in the first sign of trouble ahead, profits increased a meager 23% to $22.6 million.

1996: Humongous Entertainment acquisition
In January GT Interactive obtained the publishing rights for the highly anticipated Quake from id Software.
In February GT Interactive and Target signed an agreement in which GT Interactive became the primary consumer software supplier to all Target's 675 stores.

In June 1996 GT Interactive acquired WizardWorks, publisher of the Deer Hunter series, for 2.4 million shares and FormGen, which had the publishing rights to Duke Nukem, for 1 million shares, or $17 million.

Quake was also released in June by GT Interactive for PC. It sold 1.8 million copies, becoming a PC classic.

In July, the game developer Humongous Entertainment was bought by GT Interactive for 3.5 million shares, or $76 million. In 1995, Humongous Entertainment's revenue had risen to $10 million, an increase of 233% over 1994's revenue of $3 million. The deal gave GT Interactive rights to successful children's software titles such as the Putt-Putt franchise as well as the Freddi Fish and Spy Fox series.

In November GT Interactive acquired Warner Interactive Europe (including Renegade Software) from Time Warner for $6.3 million in cash, with this acquisition GT Interactive gained bigger access to software markets in Western Europe.

In a sign of uncertainty for its future, GT Interactive, for the year, reported a net income increase of only 11% over the previous year to $25.1 million. Revenue growth also decelerated to 56%, revenue for the year was $365 million. Making matters worse, net income in the fourth quarter reduced 16.8% to $8.5 million when compared to 1995's fourth quarter.

1997
In January GT Interactive bought One Stop, a European value software publisher, for $800,000 in cash.

In June GT Interactive signed a deal with MTV, the deal gave GT Interactive the rights to publish games based on Beavis and Butt-head and Æon Flux.

In October GT Interactive bought game developer SingleTrac for $14.7 million — $5.4 million in cash and $9.3 million in stock. SingleTrac owned and developed such games as Twisted Metal and Jet Moto. In September game developer Cavedog Entertainment, a division of Humongous Entertainment, made its first release, Total Annihilation, which sold more than 1 million copies.

On October 5, 1997, GT Interactive announced that it had signed a definitive agreement to acquire MicroProse for $250 million in stock; the deal had even been unanimously approved by the Board of Directors of both companies and was expected to be completed by the end of that year. The merger would have made GT Interactive the second largest U.S. gaming software company, exceeded only by Electronic Arts.

But on December 5 the acquisition was cancelled, according to both CEOs "the time is simply not right" for the deal. MicroProse's stock plummeted after the announcement of the deals cancellation.

GT Interactive's result was negatively affected because, in March, they stopped being the exclusive computer software distributor to Walmart, who decided to buy its software directly from the publishers.

In 1997 GT Interactive's share of the entertainment software market reached a historical low of 6.4% down from the record highs of 9% and 10% years earlier. GT Interactive was a leader only on the arcade/action category, with a 20.3% market share. Making matters worse, GT Interactive also had a high debt/equity ratio of 41%, Electronic Arts had a debt/equity ratio of just 8%. For 1997 GT Interactive's return on equity was a dismal -16.14%. For the year, GT Interactive's revenue growth continued to decelerate, increased only 45% to $530 million. During 1997 GT Interactive posted its first net loss, totaling $25 million.

1998
In May Epic Games's Unreal was published by GT Interactive, in the first 10 months over 800,000 copies were sold. Coincidentally Deer Hunter II, which was released in October also sold 800,000 copies.

In November GT Interactive bought OneZero Media for $17.2 million in stock and $20 million in total, becoming the first game publisher to own an entertainment Internet website.

Legend Entertainment was acquired for around $2 million, while Reflections Interactive was acquired for 2.3 million shares or $13.5 million. Both companies were bought in December of 1998.

In the fourth quarter of 1998 GT Interactive posted a net income of $16.7 million on revenues of $246.3 million. For the year, GT Interactive reported revenues were almost flat rising 10% to $584 million, but GT Interactive swung into black by posting a $20.3 million net income (results from the fiscal year ending on December 31, 1998).

1999: Acquisition by Infogrames
The year of 1999 brought bad news for GT Interactive's shareholders: GT Interactive posted first quarter losses of $90 million due to restructuring costs. In February, in light of the bad results, CEO Ron Chaimowitz was replaced.

Game sales in 1999 fell in comparison to 1998, which had dire consequences on GT Interactive's finances. In April, GT Interactive predicted for 2000 a first quarter loss of $55 million on revenues of around just $95 million. A failure to release 5 major games and a planned relocation to Los Angeles added to the losses. In June GT Interactive announced it had hired Bear Stearns to look into the possibility of either a merger or a sale of the company and in October GT Interactive fired 35% of its workforce, or 650 employees, mostly from its distribution section.

In June, Reflections-developed Driver was released, selling approximately 1 million copies. In July GT Interactive sold OneZero Media for $5.2 million in cash, just six months after it was purchased.

On November 16, Infogrames Entertainment, SA (IESA) announced that it would buy 70% of GT Interactive for $135 million and assume $10.5 million in debt, a deal completed by December 17.

IESA's acquisition came just in time because GT Interactive's 1999 results were dismal. Revenues fell 30% to $408 million in 1999 and GT Interactive posted a net loss of $254 million for the year (results with the fiscal year ending on December 31, 1999).

On May 10, 2000, IESA announced the renaming of GT Interactive to Infogrames, Inc. Almost three years later, on May 8, 2003, the company would again change its name, this time to Atari, Inc., becoming ATAR on the NASDAQ stock market.

Following the bankruptcy of Atari, the GT Interactive brand and trademark was soon sold to Tommo, Inc., and later Billionsoft.

Later years
On September 1, 2006, Atari, Inc. announced that its stock faced delisting from the NASDAQ stock exchange due to its price having fallen below $1.00. On September 5, 2006, David Pierce was appointed as new CEO of Atari, replacing Bruno Bonnell. Pierce previously worked as an executive at Universal Pictures, Metro-Goldwyn-Mayer, Sony Pictures, Sony Music, and Sony Wonder.

On October 2, 2006, Atari, Inc. announced that it had sold off Shiny Entertainment to Foundation 9 Entertainment, which culminated in the completion of their strategic divesture.

On April 5, 2007, Bruno Bonnell resigned his position as chairman and chief financial officer.

On November 7, 2007, GameSpot reported that Atari was beginning to run out of money, losing 12 million dollars in the first fiscal quarter of 2008.

On March 6, 2008, Infogrames made an offer to Atari, Inc. to buy out all remaining public shares for a value of US$1.68 per share or US$11 million total. The offer would make Infogrames sole owner of Atari, Inc., making it a privately held company.

On April 30, 2008, Atari, Inc. announced its intentions to accept Infogrames' buyout offer and merge with Infogrames.

On May 9, 2008, it was revealed that NASDAQ would be removing Atari from the NASDAQ stock exchange. Atari has stated its intentions to appeal the decision. Atari was notified of NASDAQ's final decision on April 24, 2008, and the appeal hearing took place on May 1, 2008. Atari was expected to raise its value to $15 million USD from the period of December 20, 2007 through to March 2008. Atari received notice of its absolute delisting on September 12, 2008.

On October 11, 2008, Infogrames completed its acquisition of Atari, Inc., making it a wholly owned subsidiary.

On January 21, 2013, Atari, Inc. and affiliates Atari Interactive Inc., Humongous, Inc. and California US Holdings, Inc. filed petitions for relief under Chapter 11 of the United States Bankruptcy Code in the United States Bankruptcy Court for the Southern District of New York with the intent of separating from its parent. All three Ataris emerged from bankruptcy one year later and subsequently entered the social casino gaming industry with Atari Casino. Frederic Chesnais, who now heads all three companies, stated their entire operations consist of a staff of 10 people.

On January 3, 2017, TMZ reported that Frontier Developments, the developer for RollerCoaster Tycoon 3, sued Atari, Inc. for not paying the company enough for royalties for the game; Frontier reported that they only received $1.17 million when they needed $3.37 million. Frontier's Chief Operating Officer David Walsh confirmed the report in a GameSpot interview, stating that they had previously attempted to resolve the issue without legal action since April 2016.

Product history

In 2002 Jakks Pacific, a toy company, released a plug-and-play video game console called the Atari 10-in-1 TV Game. It was battery-operated and shaped similarly to an Atari 2600 joystick, and included composite video and audio output. In 2004, the same company created a device called Atari Paddle Games, in the shape of one of the 2600's "paddle" controllers with appropriate titles included.

The same year that the Paddle Games were released, Atari released a TV game of their own which they called the Atari Flashback. The device was designed and produced by Atari consultant Curt Vendel through his engineering firm Legacy Engineering. With only a 10-week development window, what they produced looked like a miniature version of the Atari 7800 console originally released in 1984. Twenty titles were built into the system. The Flashback did fairly well in sales. Since the games were all recreated on hardware more closely resembling the Nintendo Entertainment System than the 7800, some of the aspects of certain games concerning the sound, graphics, or gameplay were either changed or omitted.

Because of popular demand, Atari hired Curt Vendel once again to produce a follow up product. With a longer development window, Vendel released a new version of the Flashback console, titled Atari Flashback 2, in August 2005. The Flashback 2 is based on an implementation of the original Atari 2600 on a single chip that Curt Vendel designed, allowing the original 2600 games to be run instead of ports as in the first Flashback. In addition, the included joysticks are fully compatible with the original 2600 joysticks and vice versa. Furthermore, the circuitboard in the Flashback 2 actually has connectors for modders to solder on a cartridge slot, allowing the Flashback 2 to play the entire library of 2600 games. Since 2011, the consoles have been produced and marketed by AtGames under license from Atari.

Also, in late October 2005, Atari released one of two collections of its classic arcade games for the Nokia N-Gage console, titled Atari Masterpieces. Atari Masterpieces Volume I includes classic arcade games: Asteroids, Battlezone, Black Widow, Millipede, Missile Command, Red Baron, Lunar Lander and Super Breakout, and features an exclusive interview with Nolan Bushnell. Atari Masterpieces Volume II was released in March 2006.

On May 5, 2006, Atari and Hasbro stopped BioWare and DLA from further development of premium modules and publishing near-completed premium modules for Neverwinter Nights. No reason was stated, but it was likely in anticipation of the upcoming sequel, Neverwinter Nights 2, which would lack features from these modules. They relented after community backlash.

Atari's top-selling titles have been the Dragon Ball games based on the popular anime license from Toei Animation in Japan. These include the Dragon Ball Z: Budokai series of games for next-generation console systems and the Dragon Ball Z: The Legacy of Goku series of games for the Game Boy Advance. These games have topped the best-seller charts for numerous console platforms since the release of Atari's first Dragon Ball Z game, The Legacy of Goku in 2002, which was the first Dragon Ball game to be made by an American company, Webfoot Technologies, and is one of the best-selling Game Boy Advance games of all time (#16). The best selling Budokai series is developed in Japan by Dimps and includes Dragon Ball Z: Budokai, Dragon Ball Z: Budokai 2 and Dragon Ball Z: Budokai 3). Atari is also releasing Dragon Ball Z: Budokai Tenkaichi and its sequel, Dragon Ball Z: Budokai Tenkaichi 2 which is a separate series from the Budokai series. Following the success of the Budokai and Legacy of Goku series, Atari has released numerous other Dragon Ball titles including Dragon Ball Z: Supersonic Warriors, Dragon Ball Z: Super Sonic Warriors 2, Dragon Ball Z: Sagas, Dragon Ball GT: Transformation, Dragon Ball: Advanced Adventure and Super Dragon Ball Z.

Atari also released a series of games based on The Matrix movie trilogy including Enter the Matrix and The Matrix: Path of Neo. Although not critical successes, these titles represent some of the most expensive video games ever developed. Enter the Matrix, which was developed by Shiny Entertainment, sold 1.38 million units for the PlayStation 2 and 1 million units for the GameCube.

Another success for Atari was a series based on Godzilla. Pipeworks developed and created all three of the console titles, although handheld titles were developed separately. The series started with Godzilla: Destroy All Monsters Melee for the GameCube which was released on October 11, 2002 to much success before it was ported to the Microsoft Xbox a year later. It was followed by a sequel, Godzilla: Save the Earth for the PlayStation 2 and the Xbox, on November 16, 2004. Despite Save the Earths relative commercial failure, Godzilla: Unleashed was released for the PS2 and Wii, on November 20, 2007 and December 5, 2007 respectively. Unleashed was accompanied by Godzilla Unleashed: Double Smash for the Nintendo DS, which was released on November 20, 2007.

Other popular titles of Atari, Inc. include RollerCoaster Tycoon 3, Test Drive Unlimited, Neverwinter Nights, the Alone in the Dark series and the Driver series (sold to Ubisoft for a reported $24 million).

Software piracy
Atari was one of the companies using British legal company Davenport Lyons in 2008 to recover damages from computer users illegally downloading games. It stopped using the company when they were made aware of the false claims being made against innocent members of the public.

See also

 List of Atari, Inc. games (1993–present)
 History of video games

References

External links
 

Atari
1993 establishments in New York (state)
1995 initial public offerings
1999 mergers and acquisitions
American companies established in 1993
American subsidiaries of foreign companies
Companies based in New York City
Companies formerly listed on the Nasdaq
Companies that filed for Chapter 11 bankruptcy in 2013
GoodTimes Entertainment
Home computer hardware companies
Video game companies established in 1993
Video game companies of the United States
Video game development companies
Video game publishers